Aldisa zavorensis is a species of sea snail, a marine gastropod mollusk, in the family Cadlinidae.

Distribution
This species occurs in Mozambique.

References

zavorensis
Gastropods described in 2017